The 1893 Dartmouth football team represented Dartmouth College as a member of the Triangular Football League (TFL) the 1893 college football season. Led by first-year head coach Wallace Moyle, Dartmouth compiled an overall record of 5–3 with a mark of 2–0 in TFL play, winning the league title. Edwin E. Jones was the team's captain and played at tackle. Other members of the team included Fred Folsom at end, George Huff at guard, and Walter McCornack at quarterback.

Schedule

References

Dartmouth
Dartmouth Big Green football seasons
Dartmouth football